"Can't Stay Away" is a song by Swedish artist, Darin. It was released on 28 May 2021 and is his first English-language single in seven years. The song debuted on the Swedish chart at number 73.

Charts

References

2021 songs
2021 singles
Darin (singer) songs
Songs written by Darin (singer)
Songs written by Jamie Hartman